Christian Seybold (19 March 1695, Neuenhain, Bad Soden -  29 September 1768, Vienna) was a German painter in the Baroque style. He is best known for his detailed, realistic character heads and portraits (over two dozen of himself), which sometimes stood out from the idealized ones preferred at that time. Most of his works can be classified as tronies.

Biography
Little is known about his childhood and education. He was one of eleven children in a family that originally came from Oberursel. At some unknown date, he moved to Vienna. There, in 1715, he married and became a father only three weeks later. Both his wife and child died within the following two years: his son Johann Michael only 23 days after his birth. His wife Elisabeth died 26 October 1717. Within less than seven months, he remarried. His second wife, Susanna, had two children who would live into their adulthood.

In 1745 he received an appointment as court painter to King Augustus III, who was also the Elector of Saxony, in Dresden, Four years later, he was named to fill the same position at the court of Empress Maria Theresa.

The style for his detailed character heads was heavily influenced by Balthasar Denner. For his self-portraits, he was primarily influenced by Jan Kupecký and Rembrandt. One of his first datable portraits (after 1723, before 1728) is of the imperial counsellor, Count Johann Adam von Questenberg; a prominent patron of the arts. Today his paintings are widely scattered, from the Louvre to the Uffizi and the Hermitage.

References

Further reading
 
 Harald Marx: "Realismus und "choix des attitudes". Zu einem Selbstbildnis von Christian Seybold", in: Ars auro prior: Studia Ioanni Białostocki sexagenario dicata, (1981), pp. 583–587
 Klára Garas: "Christian Seybold und das Malerbildnis in Österreich im 18. Jahrhundert", in: Bulletin du Musée Hongrois des Beaux-Arts, #34 (1981), pp. 113–137
 Gabriele Wiechert: "Christian Seybold, Wiener Hofkammermaler am Hofe Maria Theresias", In: Hessische Familienkunde Vol.33, 2010. (Online)
 Lilian Ruhe, "… Seybold hat bekannter maßen mehr als eine Schilderweise". De hofschilder Christian Seybold (1695-1768). Portretten en tronies tussen Porenmalerei, rembrandtisme en rococo, PhD-Dissertation Radboud Universiteit Nijmegen 2018
 Lilian Ruhe, ‘Rembrandt between Danube and Elbe. Christian Seybold (1695-1768) and his Self-Portrait with the Wienerisches Diarium under a Magnifying Glass’, in: Bulletin du Musée Hongrois des Beaux-Arts, 125 (2020), pp. 151-175
 Lilian Ruhe,‘Rembrandt and Balthasar Denner through the Eyes of Christian Seybold (1695-1768). The Iconography of a Self-Portrait and Porentronies Revisited', in: Ferdinand Kühnel, Nedžad Kuč, Marija Wakounig (Eds.), Framing History in East-Central Europe and Beyond. Politics - Memory - Discourse. (Europa Orientalis, 21/22 (2022), hrsg. vom Institut für Osteuropäische Geschichte an der Universität Wien), Vienna 2022, pp. 47-70

External links 

 Artnet: More paintings by Seybold
 Brief summaries of extended articles about Seybold by Lilian Ruhe in Desipienta,  #39#41
Lilian Ruhe (2014), "Christian Seybold: van "ein Mahler gebürtig von Mäntz" tot "Pictor Aulicus" in Wenen. Aanvullingen op biografie en oeuvre", in: Desipientia, 21 (2014), 2, pp. 46-56.

1695 births
1768 deaths
18th-century German painters
18th-century German male artists
German male painters
Portrait painters
Court painters
Court painters of Polish kings
People from Main-Taunus-Kreis
German emigrants to the Austrian Empire